30-30 or variation, may refer to:

 30–30 club, a term in baseball
 .30-30 Winchester, a rifle round
 ¡30-30!, Mexican artists' group, named after the rifle
 Thirty Thirty, a main character on BraveStarr television series
 Santana 30/30, a sailboat

See also

 30 by 30 world initiative
 30 for 30, ESPN TV series
 
 3030 (disambiguation)
 30 (disambiguation)